Gem Twist (June 12, 1979 – November 18, 2006) was a world champion American Thoroughbred show jumping horse registered under the name Icey Twist.   Bred by equestrian Frank Chapot, Gem Twist had an incredible career at the Grand Prix level. The gelding is the only horse to have won the "American Grand Prix Association Horse of the Year" title three times, and is regarded as one of the best show-jumpers in history.  Two genetic clones of Gem Twist were subsequently foaled after Gem's 2006 death: the first named Gemini, and later a second named Murka's Gem.

Career

Gem Twist had an extensive show jumping career between 1985 and 1997 under three different international level riders: Greg Best (up to 1992), Leslie Howard (1992-1995), and Laura Chapot (1995 onward).

With Greg Best

Gem Twist began winning early in his career with rider Greg Best, including the 1985 USET Talent Derby as a six-year-old. He went on to win his first two competitions at the Grand Prix level, the Grand Prix of Tampa and the Grand Prix of Florida, in 1987. He finished the year with his first American Grand Prix Association (AGA) Horse of the Year honor, as well as a team silver medal from the Pan American Games.

Best continued to ride Gem Twist for several years with great success, including earning two silver medals at the 1988 Olympics in Seoul. In 1989, Gem Twist was named the American Grand Prix Association Horse of the Year for the second time.

In 1990, he was named the "World's Best Horse" at the World Equestrian Games in Stockholm. Best injured his shoulder in 1992, however, and the ride was turned over to Leslie Burr Howard (then Leslie Burr Lenehan).

With Leslie Howard

Howard continued the gelding's career, winning both another AGA Horse of the Year title and the AGA Championship in 1993.  The team qualified for the 1994 World Equestrian Games, but an infection occurring at the games disqualified Gem Twist from the championship round and put him out of competition for almost a year.

With Laura Chapot

In 1995, after a lengthy recuperation period, Gem Twist came back into the show ring with Laura Chapot. Although Chapot was still a "Young Rider" (21 and under), her first year with Gem Twist was very successful. She won the World Cup class at the $100,000 Autumn Classic, earning her the Budweiser Rookie of the Year award, and she rode the horse to his third win at the Budweiser AGA Championships. Her second season continued to be successful, with wins at three World Cup qualifying classes, including Tampa's Volvo Grand Prix of Florida—whose starting field of more than eighty horses made it the largest grand prix jumper class of all time.

She finished Gem's career with a win at the World Cup USA East League Championship (which was held at the same venue at which he won his first Grand Prix with Best nine years earlier).  Chapot formally retired Gem Twist at the National Horse Show at Madison Square Garden on November 1, 1997.

During his career, Gem Twist accumulated more than $800,000 in prize money. In 2002, Gem Twist was inducted into the United States Show Jumping Hall of Fame.  He was euthanized November 18, 2006 at the age of twenty-seven.

Gemini, the first clone of Gem Twist
In early 2006, Practical Horseman magazine first leaked a report that Gem Twist was to be the subject of a cloning experiment by a then-undisclosed international laboratory.

On September 15, 2008, the French genetic bank, Cryozootech, announced the successful birth of a healthy clone of Gem Twist. As was Gem Twist, the foal was born bay, with a star, and sock on his right front, and is expected to dapple or grey-out in relative short order.

Gemini, at 10 months, was moved from the Chapot family's Chado Farm in Texas to Frank Chapot's Neshanic Station farm in New Jersey. Gemini is showing his Gem Twist lineage, he's beginning to become a grey, as his coat shows flecks of white hair, and jumps fences over 3 feet high.

Gemini's siring career
In May 2012, it was revealed that Gemini has successfully sired his first offspring.

He was bred to the Thoroughbred mare Otherwise Engaged, who gave birth to a healthy chestnut colt.  The colt was born at Park Avenue Stables in Bucks County PA in March 2012, and his name is The Proposal. Any offspring of clones are not considered Thoroughbreds as the breed requires natural procreation for the bloodlines to qualify for the stud book. However, the clones would be eligible for Olympic competition.

Murka's Gem, the second clone of Gem Twist
Horse & Hound magazine confirmed the birth and existence of a second clone of Gem Twist.  This was nicknamed Gem Twin (originally, a nickname also given to Gemini).  He was sold to new owner Olga White, and the Chapot's website confirms that he will be stationed at stud in Europe, under the management of Peter Charles.

On July 5, 2012 it was revealed that the new colt's official name would be Murka's Gem and that there were no plans to compete him, only to have him stand at stud.

Pedigree

References

External links 
 "The Legend of Gem Twist" - Extensive history and photographs
 "Clone of Show Jumper Gem Twist Born" - Details on Gem's cloning and the birth of his clone

Show jumping horses
Horses in the Olympics
1979 racehorse births
2006 racehorse deaths
Individual male horses